Warren High School, or WHS, is a public four-year high school located at 311 South Water Street in Warren, Illinois, a village in Jo Daviess County, Illinois, in the Midwestern United States. WHS serves the communities and surrounding areas of Warren, Apple River, and Nora. The campus is located 38 miles east of Dubuque, Iowa, and serves a mixed village and rural residential community.

Academics

Athletics
Warren High School competes in the Northwest Upstate Illini Conference and is a member school in the Illinois High School Association. Their mascot is the Warriors, with school colors of orange and black. The school has one state championship on record in team athletics and activities. 2019-20 Football State Championship in Division 7 in Wisconsin-Coop with South Wayne Wisconsin.  Due to their small enrollment, WHS coops with a neighboring high school for several sports (Stockton High School for Boys Baseball and Girls Track and Field).

History

Warren High School has no known consolidations in the recent past. Surrounding communities may have possessed high schools at some time which were consolidated into the current RRHS.

References

External links
 Warren High School
 Warren Community Unit School District 205

Public high schools in Illinois
Schools in Jo Daviess County, Illinois